Paraburkholderia ginsengisoli is a gram-negative, rod-shaped, motile bacterium with unipolar polytrichous flagella from the genus Paraburkholderia and the family Burkholderiaceae which was isolated from soil of a ginseng field in South Korea. Paraburkholderia ginsengisoli has the ability to produce β-glucosidase.

References

ginsengisoli
Bacteria described in 2006